"Speed of Light" is a song by the English heavy metal band Iron Maiden from their sixteenth studio album, The Book of Souls. The song was released as a music video on 14 August 2015 and was also made available as a digital download and issued as a single-track CD exclusive to Best Buy in the US. It is the band's first single since 1996's "Virus" to use their original logo on the cover.

Music video
The song's music video was directed and produced by Llexi Leon, creator of the comic book series Eternal Descent, as well as the virtual band of the same name. The video is an "'homage' to four decades of video gaming", centering on the band's mascot, Eddie, as he travels "through the combined 35-year history of video games". The visual effects were provided by The Brewery, who had previously worked on the films Sex & Drugs & Rock & Roll (2010) and Spike Island (2012), as well as the 2014 TV series Fleming: The Man Who Would Be Bond.

Personnel
Iron Maiden
 Bruce Dickinson – vocals
 Dave Murray – guitars
 Janick Gers – guitars
 Adrian Smith – guitars
 Steve Harris – bass
 Nicko McBrain – drums
Production
 Kevin Shirley – production, mixing
 Steve Harris – co-production

References

Iron Maiden songs
2015 singles
Songs written by Adrian Smith
Songs written by Bruce Dickinson
Song recordings produced by Kevin Shirley
Parlophone singles
2014 songs